The Fiction We Live is the second studio album by the American post-hardcore band From Autumn to Ashes. It was produced by Garth Richardson and released September 9, 2003, through Vagrant Records. Melanie Wills of One True Thing makes a guest appearance once again, contributing to the vocals on "Autumns Monologue." This is the last album to feature Scott Gross and Mike Pilato. It peaked at number 73 on the US Billboard 200 charts.

Videos
Three music videos were produced for The Fiction We Live: "The After Dinner Payback", "Lilacs & Lolita," and "Milligram Smile." They aired on Headbangers Ball upon release.

Musical style
The album features more clean vocals than the previous album, Too Bad You're Beautiful. Four songs have no screaming vocals, "No Trivia", "Autumns Monologue", "The Fiction We Live", and "I'm the Best at Ruining My Life." "Autumns Monologue" is a re-working of "The Fiction We Live" with the collaboration of Melanie Wills.

Track listing

Personnel

From Autumn to Ashes
Benjamin Perri – vocals
Francis Mark – drums, vocals
Scott Gross – rhythm guitar
Brian Denevee – lead guitar
Mike Pilato – bass guitar

Artwork
P.R. Brown – art Direction, photography, design

Managerial
Cory Brennan –  management
Irene Richter –  managing assistant
Tim Borror –  US booking agent
John Jackson –  international booking agent

Production
Garth Richardson – producer
Dean Mahler – engineer
Christopher Shaw – mixing
Zach Blackstone – mixing assistant
Chris Crippen – drum technician
Ben Kaplan – digital Editing, engineer, programming
Misha Rajaratnam – mixing assistant
Lee Robertson & Gordon Sran – assistant engineers
Darryl Romphf – assistant engineer, production coordination
Howie Weinberg – mastering

Charts

Album

References

2003 albums
From Autumn to Ashes albums
Vagrant Records albums
Albums produced by Garth Richardson